The men's football competition at the 1994 Goodwill Games consisted of a single all-star match on 7 August 1994. It was played between Russia and a World XI at Kirov Stadium in Saint Petersburg, Russia. This was the first instance of football being played at the Goodwill Games.

Russia defeated the World All-Stars 2–1 to win the football competition.

Background
The competition was the first time football was played at the Goodwill Games. The fixture was an all-star game between the Russia national team and a "World XI" selection. The match was Russia's first since the 1994 FIFA World Cup months earlier, where the team finished third in their group and were eliminated. The Russian team, under new manager Oleg Romantsev, included six players from their World Cup squad squad: Dmitri Khlestov, Yuriy Nikiforov, Andrey Pyatnitsky, Vladislav Ternavsky, Omari Tetradze and Ilya Tsymbalar. Prior to the match, there was speculation that stars from the 1994 World Cup would be included in the World XI, including Golden Ball winner Romário of Brazil. However, this did not come to fruition due to many players being bound by their club contracts, and thus only two players from the prior World Cup were selected for the World All-Stars: Bulgarian Boncho Genchev and American Roy Wegerle. Due to a shortage in players for the All-Stars, two Russian forwards – both also at the 1994 World Cup – also joined the team: Dmitri Radchenko and Oleg Salenko. Franz Beckenbauer was planned as the manager for the All-Stars, but was unable to attend due to contractual stipulations requiring his presence in Japan. Fellow German Udo Lattek instead coached the World XI. The exhibition match, which was unofficial for Russia, was played on 7 August 1994 as part of the closing ceremony of the 1994 Goodwill Games. Unlimited substitutions were allowed, and players who were substituted out were allowed to re-enter the match.

Match

Details

Statistics

Goalscorers

Tournament ranking

Medal summary

Medal table

Medalists

Notes

References

External links
 How Romantsev beat the world team at Russian Football Union 

Football
1994
International association football matches
Russia national football team matches
August 1994 sports events in Russia
1994 in association football
1994 in Russian football
International association football competitions hosted by Russia
1994 in Saint Petersburg
Football in Saint Petersburg
Sports competitions in Saint Petersburg